The canton of Thorigny-sur-Marne is a French former administrative division, located in the arrondissement of Torcy, in the Seine-et-Marne département (Île-de-France région). It was disbanded following the French canton reorganisation which came into effect in March 2015.

Demographics

Composition 
The canton of Thorigny-sur-Marne was composed of 16 communes:

Bailly-Romainvilliers
Carnetin
Chalifert
Chanteloup-en-Brie
Chessy
Conches-sur-Gondoire
Coupvray
Dampmart
Guermantes
Jablines
Jossigny
Lesches
Magny-le-Hongre
Montévrain
Serris
Thorigny-sur-Marne

See also
Cantons of the Seine-et-Marne department
Communes of the Seine-et-Marne department

References

Thorigny sur marne
2015 disestablishments in France
States and territories disestablished in 2015